Mallotus korthalsii is a species of flowering plant in the family Euphorbiaceae, native to Borneo, Java, Malaya, the Philippines and Sumatra. It was first described by Johannes Müller Argoviensis in 1866.

References

korthalsii
Flora of Borneo
Flora of Java
Flora of Malaya
Flora of the Philippines
Plants described in 1866